Pat Smeaton (12 November 1857 - 11 August 1928) was a Scotland international rugby union player.

Rugby Union career

Amateur career

Smeaton played for Edinburgh Academicals. He was club captain for the 1881-82 season.

Although favouring playing in the back line, Smeaton was noted for his versality. In noting a match between the Academicals and Royal HSFP it was observed:
P. W. Smeaton, who was a sort of handy man, sometimes in, sometimes out of the forward division, stole away from a throw-out and 'galloped' over the line for the Edinburgh Academical winning score in the 'School' match. Smeaton had a style of progression peculiarly his own. It was more a gallop than a run.

Provincial career

He played for Edinburgh District in their inter-city match against Glasgow District on 4 December 1880. He started the match playing at Three Quarters.

Smeaton played for East of Scotland Dsitrict in their match against West of Scotland District on 5 February 1881.

International career

Smeaton played for Scotland 3 times, from 1881 to 1883.

References

1857 births
1928 deaths
Scottish rugby union players
Edinburgh Academicals rugby union players
Scotland international rugby union players
East of Scotland District players
Edinburgh District (rugby union) players
People from Kincardine, Fife
Rugby union players from Fife